The Brave Don't Run is the debut album of rock band Midnight Youth, released on April 27, 2009 through Warner Music. The album debuted at number two on the New Zealand Album Chart on May 3, 2009, The album features two gold singles in NZ, featuring "The Letter" & "All On Our Own".

Background 
The album was recorded in studios in New York and Auckland.

Album artwork 
The Brave Don't Run album artwork was illustrated by Sam Yong. The album art is inspired by different elements from the songs within the album, but mainly the title track "Cavalry". The cover is a homage to the painting of Napoleon by Jacques-Louis David.

Singles 
 "The Letter": In October 2008, the first single to be lifted off the album was released. The single performed well on the radio and television and eventually reached number 20 on the New Zealand Singles Chart.
 "All On Our Own": In March 2009, the album's second single was released and debuted on the New Zealand Singles Chart at number 18. It peaked at number 6 on the chart.
 "Learning to Fall": Released in June 2009 as the third single.
 "Cavalry": Released in October 2009 as the fourth single.
 "Golden Love": The fifth single.

Track listing

Charts

Certifications

References 

2009 debut albums
Midnight Youth albums